USS Macon (ZRS-5) was a rigid airship built and operated by the United States Navy for scouting and served as a "flying aircraft carrier", designed to carry biplane parasite aircraft, five single-seat Curtiss F9C Sparrowhawk for scouting or two-seat Fleet N2Y-1 for training. In service for less than two years, in 1935 the Macon was damaged in a storm and lost off California's Big Sur coast, though most of the crew were saved. The wreckage is listed as the USS Macon Airship Remains on the U.S. National Register of Historic Places.

Less than  shorter than Hindenburg, both Macon and her sister ship  were among the largest flying objects in the world in terms of length and volume. Although both of the hydrogen-filled, Zeppelin-built Hindenburg and LZ 130 Graf Zeppelin II were longer, the two American-built sister naval airships still hold the world record for helium-filled rigid airships.

Construction

USS Macon was built at the Goodyear Airdock in Springfield Township, Ohio by the Goodyear-Zeppelin Corporation. Because this was by far the biggest airship ever to be built in America, a team of experienced German airship engineers—led by Chief Designer Karl Arnstein—instructed and supported design and construction of both the U.S. Navy airships Akron and Macon.

Macon had a structured duraluminum hull with three interior keels. The airship was kept aloft by 12 helium-filled gas cells made from gelatin-latex fabric. Inside the hull, the ship had eight German-made Maybach VL II 12-cylinder,  gasoline-powered engines that drove outside propellers. The propellers could be rotated down or backwards, providing an early form of thrust vectoring to control the ship during takeoff and landings. The rows of slots in the hull above each engine were part of a system to condense out the water vapor from the engine exhaust gases for use as buoyancy compensation ballast to compensate for the loss of weight as fuel was consumed.

Service history

Christening and commissioning
Macon was christened on 11 March 1933, by Jeanette Whitton Moffett, wife of Rear Admiral William A. Moffett, Chief of the U.S. Navy's Bureau of Aeronautics. The airship was named after the city of Macon, Georgia, which was the largest city in the Congressional district of Carl Vinson, then the chairman of the U.S. House of Representatives' Committee on Naval Affairs.

The airship first flew on 21 April, aloft over northern Ohio for nearly 13 hours with 105 aboard, just over a fortnight after the loss of Akron in which Admiral Moffett and 72 others were killed. Macon was commissioned into the U.S. Navy on 23 June 1933, with Commander Alger H. Dresel in command.

1933

On 24 June 1933, Macon left Goodyear's field for Naval Air Station (NAS) Lakehurst, New Jersey, where the new airship was based for the summer while undergoing a series of training flights.

Macon had a far more productive career than Akron, which crashed on 4 April 1933. The commanders of Macon developed the doctrine and techniques of using her on-board aircraft for scouting while the airship remained out of sight of the opposing forces during exercises. Macon participated in several fleet exercises, though the men who framed and conducted the exercises lacked an understanding of the airship's capabilities and weaknesses. It became standard practice to remove the landing gear of the Sparrowhawks while aboard the airship and then replace it with a fuel tank, thus giving the aircraft 30 percent more range.

Macon first operated aircraft on 6 July 1933 during trial flights out of Lakehurst, New Jersey. The planes were stored in bays inside the hull and were launched and retrieved using a trapeze.

The airship left the East Coast on 12 October 1933, on a transcontinental flight to her new permanent homebase at NAS Sunnyvale (now Moffett Federal Airfield) near San Francisco in Santa Clara County, California.

1934
In 1934, two two-seat Waco UBF XJW-1 biplanes equipped with skyhooks were delivered to USS Macon.

In June 1934, Lieutenant Commander Herbert V. Wiley took command of the airship, and shortly afterwards he surprised President Roosevelt (and the Navy) when Macon searched for and located the heavy cruiser , which was then carrying the president back from a trip to Hawaii. Newspapers were dropped to the President on the ship, and the following communications were sent back to the airship: "from Houston: 1519 The President compliments you and your planes on your fine performance and excellent navigation 1210 and 1519 Well Done and thank you for the papers the President 1245."  The commander of the Fleet, Admiral Joseph M. Reeves, was upset about the matter: but the Commander of the Bureau of Aviation, Admiral Ernest J. King was not. Wiley, one of only three survivors of the crash of the Akron, was soon promoted to commander, served as the captain of the battleship  in the final two years of World War II, and then retired from the Navy in 1947 as a rear admiral.

Loss

Leading up to the crash

On 20 April 1934, the Macon left Sunnyvale for a challenging cross-continent flight east to Opa-locka, Florida. Then, in the West Texas heat, the sun raised the helium temperature, and the consequent expanding gas was automatically venting as the airship flew along at pressure height once again. Full engine power was required as the weather became turbulent. Following a severe gust near Van Horn, Texas, a diagonal girder in frame 17.5, near the fin junction, failed, followed soon by a second diagonal girder. Rapid damage control, led by Chief Boatswain's Mate Robert J. Davis, repaired the girders within a half hour. Macon completed the rest of the journey safely, mooring at Opa-locka on 22 April. More permanent repairs there took 9 days. However, the addition of duralumin channels, to reinforce frame 17.5 at its junction with the upper fin, was not completed. Grounding the Macon until these reinforcements were made was considered unnecessary.

Crash

On 12 February 1935, the repair process was still incomplete when, returning to Sunnyvale from fleet maneuvers, Macon ran into a storm off Point Sur, California. During the storm, the ship was caught in a wind shear which caused structural failure of the unstrengthened ring (17.5) to which the upper tailfin was attached. The fin failed to the side and was carried away. Pieces of structure punctured the rear gas cells and caused gas leakage. The commander, acting rapidly and on fragmentary information, ordered an immediate and massive discharge of ballast. The last SOS call from Commander Wiley stated "Will abandon ship as soon as we land on the water somewhere 20 miles off of Pt. Sur, probably 10 miles at sea." It took 20 minutes to descend and, settling gently into the sea, Macon sank off Monterey Bay. Only two crew members were lost thanks to the warm conditions and the introduction of life jackets and inflatable rafts after the Akron tragedy. Radioman 1st Class Ernest Edwin Dailey jumped ship while still too high above the ocean surface to survive the fall and Mess Attendant 1st Class Florentino Edquiba drowned while swimming back into the wreckage to try to retrieve personal belongings. An officer was rescued when Commander Wiley swam to his aid, an action for which he was later decorated. Sixty-four survivors were picked up by the cruiser , the cruiser  took 11 aboard and the cruiser  saved six.
Eyewitness Dorsey A. Pulliam, serving aboard USS Colorado, wrote about the crash in a letter dated 13 February 1935:

In another letter, dated 16 February 1935, he wrote:

Macon, after 50 flights since it was commissioned, was stricken from the Navy list on 26 February 1935. Subsequent airships for Navy use were of a nonrigid design.

A depiction of the crash by artist Noel Sickles was the first piece of art sent over the wire by the Associated Press.

Wreck site exploration

The Monterey Bay Aquarium Research Institute (MBARI) succeeded in locating and surveying the debris field of Macon in February 1991, and was able to recover some artifacts. The exploration included sonar, video, and still camera data, as well as some recovery of parts.

In May 2005, MBARI returned to the site as part of a year-long research project to identify archaeological resources in the bay. Side-scan sonar was used to survey the site.

2006 expedition
A more complete return, including exploration with remotely operated vehicles and involving researchers from MBARI, Stanford University, and the National Oceanic and Atmospheric Administration's Office of National Marine Sanctuaries, took place in September 2006. Video clips of the expedition were made available to the public through the OceansLive Web Portal, a service of NOAA.

The 2006 expedition was a success, and revealed a number of new surprises and changes since the last visit, approximately 15 years previously. High-definition video and more than 10,000 new images were captured, which were assembled into a navigation-grade photomosaic of the wreck.

Protection

The location of the wreck site remains secret and is within the Monterey Bay National Marine Sanctuary. It is not accessible to divers due to depth.

The U.S. National Park Service states:

The site was listed on the U.S. National Register of Historic Places on 29 January 2010. The listing was announced as the featured listing in the National Park Service's weekly list of 12 February 2010.

In popular culture
Macon is featured as a setting and key plot element in Max McCoy's novel Indiana Jones and the Philosopher's Stone; Indiana Jones travels aboard Macon while it makes a transatlantic flight to London.

Macon is featured toward the end of the 1934 Warner Bros. film Here Comes the Navy starring James Cagney, Pat O'Brien and Gloria Stuart.

Footage of the Macon is used in the 1933 disaster film Deluge (1933 film).

The crash of Macon is depicted at the beginning of the 1937 film The Go Getter, featuring George Brent as her helmsman.

See also
 List of airships of the United States Navy
 List of airship accidents
 Hangar One, built to house Macon

References

Bibliography

External links

 Airships.net: USS Akron and Macon
 A 1964 KPIX-TV documentary about the U.S.S. Macon
 U.S. Naval Historical Center pages on ZRS-5
 Casualties: US Navy and Marine Corps Personnel Killed and Injured in Selected Accidents and Other Incidents Not Directly the Result of Enemy Action
 Uncovering the USS Macon: The Underwater Airship" Der Spiegel
 Construction of the USS Macon Airship (photo gallery)
 KQED has put together a video with info about USS Macon, historical and wreck-site footage, as well as info about the new zeppelin that is flying over the San Francisco Bay Area.
 Moffett Field Museum near San Jose, California has an exhibit dedicated to the USS Macon.

Airborne aircraft carriers
USS
1933 ships
1935 in aviation
Aviation accidents and incidents in the United States in 1935
Accidents and incidents involving balloons and airships
1935 in California
1930s United States aircraft
Transportation on the National Register of Historic Places in California
Goodyear aircraft
Akron-class airships
National Register of Historic Places in Monterey County, California
Big Sur
Aircraft on the National Register of Historic Places
Moffett Field